Tianluokeng tulou cluster is one of the better known groups of Fujian tulou. It is located in the village of Tianluokeng in the town of Fujian, Nanjing County, southern Fujian province.

The cluster consists of a square earth building at the center of a quincunx, surrounded by four round earth buildings (or more exactly, 3 round earth buildings and one oval shape earth building), figuratively nicknamed "" (.

A tulou (lit. "earth building") is a unique architecture found only in the mountainous areas bordering  Fujian and Guangdong in southern China. The "Earth building" is an enclosed buildings, usually square or circular in shape, with a very thick earth wall (up to 6 feet thick) and wooden skeletons, from three to five stories high, housing up to 80 families. These earth buildings have only one entrance, guarded by  wooden doors re-enforced with an outer shell of iron plate. The top level of these earth building have gun holes for defense against bandits. In spite of the earth wall, some of them are more than 700 years old, surviving through centuries of natural elements, including earthquakes, yet still standing solid. There are more than 35,000 earth buildings to be found in southern China, among them a little over 3,000 have been classified as Fujian Tulou

On July 7, 2008, at the UNESCO 32nd session held in Quebec City, Canada, the Tianluokeng Tulou cluster was inscribed as one of 46 Fujian Tulou World Heritage Sites.

The five earth buildings at the Snail Pit village are:
The square earth building named Buyun building(Reaching the Cloud building) at the center of the quincunx. It was the first earth building at this site, built in 1796. It is three stories high, each story has 26 rooms, four sets of stairs, and a circular corridor in front of the rooms. The Buyun building was burnt down by bandits in 1936, and rebuilt in 1953 according to the original shape.
The Hechang building, a three story high round earth building.
Zhenchang building, three story, round shape, 26 rooms per story, built in 1930.
Ruiyun building, built in 1936.
The last Wenchang building of 1966, 3 stories, 32 rooms per story.

The cluster is located about four hours drive by bus or taxi from Xiamen, through winding and bumpy narrow mountain roads (Fujian Provincial Highway 309 (S309), or county roads).

References

Buildings and structures in Zhangzhou
Hakka culture in China
Hakka architecture